Troy Hearfield (born 31 October 1987 in Tamworth, NSW) is an Australian football (soccer) player who plays for Sawtell FC.

Club career
Hearfield signed for Newcastle Jets in 2006. On 2 February 2007, Hearfield made his professional debut in a game against Sydney FC.

He made the transfer to Wellington Phoenix on 28 March 2008 after a rift between his former club Newcastle Jets about his release, and scored his first Phoenix goal against his former club on 23 November 2008. Over the last two season Hearfield has been a regular starter, playing out of position in right back for Wellington Phoenix. He worked hard and became a solid addition in the defence, he also was good in attack when on the overlap. He parted ways with Phoenix at the end of the 2010–2011 season and signed with the Central Coast Mariners for the 2011–2012 A-League season. Over the off-season Hearfield was on a loan deal for four months with Indonesian outfit Pelita Jaya. He scored his first goal in a 2–2 draw against Semen Padang FC.

Hearfield made his debut and scored for the Mariners in a pre-season friendly match against Scottish giants Celtic. It has since been reported on 5 April 2013 that Hearfield had tested positive to a recreational drug during a failed drug test and had been sacked by the Mariners. The Mariners released a statement on the same day confirming this however denied that he was sacked and that a mutual agreement was met between the club and Hearfield for him to be released from his contract.

International career
He has represented Australia at both U-20 and U-23 level, however he was unlucky to miss out on selection for the Australian Olympic Football team. He has shown a good goal scoring record at both levels.

A-League career statistics

Honours

Club
Newcastle Jets:
 A-League Championship: 2007–08

Central Coast Mariners:
 A-League Premiership: 2011–12

References

External links
 

1987 births
Living people
Australian soccer players
Australia youth international soccer players
Australia under-20 international soccer players
Newcastle Jets FC players
People from Tamworth, New South Wales
A-League Men players
Wellington Phoenix FC players
Central Coast Mariners FC players
Pelita Bandung Raya players
Expatriate association footballers in New Zealand
Expatriate footballers in Indonesia
Liga 1 (Indonesia) players
Australian Institute of Sport soccer players
New South Wales Institute of Sport alumni
Association football defenders
Sportsmen from New South Wales
Soccer players from New South Wales